Bernard Timothy Walsh, MD, FAED, is the William and Joy Ruane Professor of Pediatric Psychopharmacology in the Department of Psychiatry at Columbia University and the author, editor, and co-editor of five books on adolescent health and eating disorders. He has served as President of both the Academy for Eating Disorders and the Eating Disorders Research Society, and chaired the Eating Disorders Work Group for both DSM-IV and DSM-5.

Publications
Books
   2017 - Eating Disorders and Obesity, Third Edition: A Comprehensive Handbook.  Mar 3, 2017 by Kelly D. Brownell, PhD, and B. Timothy Walsh, MD
   2015 - Handbook of Assessment and Treatment of Eating Disorders. by B. Timothy Walsh (Author, Editor), Robyn Sysko (Editor), Deborah R. Glasofer (Editor).  American Psychiatric Publishing; 1st Edition (October 9, 2015).  . American Psychiatric Publishing. 1st edition (August 15, 1998).  . 
   2007 - Next to Nothing A Firsthand Account of One Teenager's Experience with an Eating Disorder, 2007 by Arnold, Carrie w. B. Timothy Walsh, MD
   2005 - Treating and Preventing Adolescent Mental Health Disorders: What We Know and What We Don't Know (Adolescent Mental Health Initiative).  Jul 14, 2005 by Dwight L. M.D. Evans and Edna B. Ph.D. Foa
   1998 - Child Psychopharmacology.  Dr. B. Timothy Walsh, MD, John M. Oldham, and Michelle B. Riba, MD.

Journal Articles
   Walsh BT: The Enigmatic Persistence of Anorexia Nervosa. American Journal of Psychiatry 2013.
   Walsh BT, Attia E: Eating Disorders. In: Longo DL, Fauci AS, Kasper DL, Hauser SL, Jameson JL, Loscalzo J (eds): Harrison's Principles of Internal Medicine (18th edition)., McGraw Hill, NY, 2011
   Walsh BT: The importance of eating behavior in eating disorders. Physiology and Behavior 2011;104: 525-529
   Attia E, Walsh BT: The Behavioral Management of Anorexia Nervosa. New England Journal of Medicine 2009;360: 500-506
   Walsh BT, Kaplan AS, Attia E, Olmsted M, Parides M, Carter JC, Pike KM, Devlin MJ, Woodside B, Roberto CA, Rockert W: Fluoxetine after weight restoration in anorexia nervosa: a randomized controlled trial. JAMA 2006;295: 2605-12

References

External links
 Profile for Bernard Walsh, MD, at Columbia University's Psychiatry Department
 NEDA profile for Walsh, with headshot

Columbia University faculty
Psychiatry academics
Living people
Year of birth missing (living people)
Harvard Medical School alumni
Princeton University alumni